The Lavender Hill Mob is a 1951 comedy film starring Alex Guinness.

The Lavender Hill Mob or Lavender Hill Mob may also refer to:

Lavender Hill Mob (band), Canadian rock band
Lavender Hill Mob (gay activist group), 1980s American militant gay rights activist group
The Lavender Hill Mob (play), play based on the 1951 film